West Side House is a Grade II listed house on the west side of Wimbledon Common, Wimbledon, London, built in about 1760 or earlier.

Spencer Gore, who won the first Wimbledon lawn tennis championship in 1877 and played for Surrey County Cricket Club, was born and raised at West Side House.

References

External links

Grade II listed buildings in the London Borough of Merton
Houses completed in 1760
Houses in the London Borough of Merton
Grade II listed houses in London